Energy in Estonia depends on fossil fuels. Finland and Estonia are two of the last countries in the world still burning peat.

Electricity
Electricity production in Estonia is largely dependent on fossil fuels.
In 2007, more than 90% of power was generated from oil shale.
The Estonian energy company Eesti Energia owns the largest oil shale-fuelled power plants in the world, Narva Power Plants.

There are two submarine power cables from Finland, with combined rated power of 1000 MW.

Transport sector
In February 2013, Estonia had a network of 165 fast chargers for electric cars (for a population of 1.3 million).

See also 

 Electricity sector in Estonia

References

External links